The Podunk River is a stream in Hartford County, Connecticut. It is a tributary to the Connecticut River.

The name is derived from the Algonquin words pod for low and unk for beyond or "the low land beyond" or along the Connecticut and its tributary the Podunk River where they farmed the fertile soil along the streams.

References

Rivers of Connecticut
Rivers of Hartford County, Connecticut